The media of Los Angeles are influential and include some of the most important production facilities in the world. As part of the "Creative Capital of the World", it is a major global center for media and entertainment. In addition to being the home of Hollywood, the center of the American motion picture industry, the Los Angeles area is the second largest media market in North America (after New York City). Many of the nation's media conglomerates either have their primary headquarters (like The Walt Disney Company) or their West Coast operations (like NBCUniversal) based in the region. Universal Music Group, one of the "Big Four" record labels, is also based in the Los Angeles area.

Five of the six major American television broadcast networks (ABC, CBS, NBC, Fox, and MyNetworkTV) all have production facilities and offices throughout various areas of Los Angeles. All five, plus major Spanish-language networks Telemundo, Univision, and UniMás, also own and operate stations that serve the Los Angeles market. The region also has four PBS stations, with KCET, re-joining the network as secondary affiliate in August 2019, after spending the previous eight years as the nation's largest independent public television station.

The major daily newspaper is the Los Angeles Times, while La Opinión is the city's major daily Spanish-language paper. The Hollywood Reporter and Variety are significant entertainment industry papers in Los Angeles. There are also a wide variety of smaller regional newspapers, alternative weeklies and magazines, including LA Weekly, Los Angeles magazine, the Los Angeles Business Journal, the Los Angeles Daily Journal, and the Los Angeles Downtown News. In addition to the English- and Spanish-language papers, numerous local periodicals serve immigrant communities in their native languages, including Korean, Persian, Russian and Japanese.

The Southern California News Group, a subsidiary of Digital First Media, operates eleven other regional daily newspapers in greater Los Angeles, with all covering four of the five Los Angeles DMA counties.  The Los Angeles Daily News, published in the San Fernando Valley community of Woodland Hills, serves as the flagship newspaper of SCNG; other publications under the SCNG umbrella include the Torrance-based Daily Breeze (serving the South Bay and southwestern Los Angeles County), Long Beach Press-Telegram, Pasadena Star-News, and the Orange County Register, which SCNG acquired (along with the Riverside Press-Enterprise) from Freedom Communications in March 2016. Los Angeles arts, culture and nightlife news is also covered by a number of local and national online guides like Time Out Los Angeles, Thrillist, Kristin's List, LAist, and Flavorpill.

Film

The city's Hollywood neighborhood is notable as the home of the U.S. film industry, and its name has come to be a shorthand reference for the industry and the people in it. The industry's "Big Five" major film studios (Columbia, Disney, Paramount, Universal, and Warner Bros.) are all based in or around Hollywood. Several other smaller and independent film companies also operate in the Los Angeles area.

Print media

Daily newspapers
Asbarez (Armenian)
The Epoch Times (Chinese)
Hoy (Spanish)
Investor's Business Daily
The Korea Times (Korean)
The Los Angeles Bulletin and Civic Center NEWSource
Los Angeles Daily Journal (legal daily)
Los Angeles Daily News
Los Angeles Times
Metropolitan News-Enterprise (legal daily)
MyNewsLA
La Opinión (Spanish)
Người Việt Daily News (Vietnamese)
Rafu Shimpo (Japanese)
San Fernando Valley Sun
The Daily Telescope
Viễn Đông Daily News (Vietnamese)
Việt Báo Daily News (Vietnamese)
World Journal (Chinese)

Weekly and monthly newspapers
Argonaut (Marina del Rey/Culver City community weekly)
Beverly Press (community weekly)
CaribPress (Caribbean monthly)
The Century City News (community bi-weekly)
Cultural News (English-language Japanese monthly)
India Journal (Indian weekly)
The Jewish Journal of Greater Los Angeles (Jewish weekly)
 L.A. Watts Times (community weekly)
LA Weekly (alternative weekly)
Larchmont Chronicle (community weekly)
Los Angeles Asian Journal (Filipino biweekly)
Los Angeles Business Journal (business weekly)
Los Angeles Downtown News (community weekly)
Los Angeles Free Press (weekly underground newspaper)
The Los Angeles Independent (community weekly)
Los Angeles Sentinel (African-American weekly)
Los Angeles Wave - Culver City edition (community weekly)
"Our Weekly" - Black, African-American news and information. www.ourweekly.com
Culver City Star
PACE NEWS-African-American news. www.pacenewsonline.com
The Westsider
Los Angeles Wave - Northeast edition (community weekly)
Belvedere Citizen
Eagle Rock Sentinel
East L.A. Tribune
Eastside Journal
Highland Park News Herald & Journal
Lincoln Heights Bulletin
Mount Washington Star Review
El Sereno Star
Los Angeles Wave - West edition (community weekly)
Angeles Mesa News
Central News Wave
Inglewood/Hawthorne Wave
Southside Journal
Southwest Topics Wave
Tribune News
Los Feliz Ledger (community monthly)
Pacific Citizen (Asian-American semi-monthly)
Palisadian-Post (community weekly)
Park Labrea News (community weekly)
The Angelus (Catholic weekly - Formerly The Tidings)
The Tolucan Times (community weekly)
Valley Vantage (community weekly)
Warner Center News (community weekly)

Magazines
The Advocate
Angeleno
Bel-Air View
Brentwood Magazine
Brentwood News
Discover Hollywood Magazine
Entertainment Weekly
The Hollywood Reporter
The Reader Magazine
L.A. Record
Los Angeles
Los Angeles Confidential
Pacific Palisades 90272
Sense
Time Out Los Angeles
Variety

Defunct
City News Los Angeles
Eastside Sun (community weekly)
Illustrated Daily News
LA Youth
Los Angeles CityBeat
Los Angeles Express
Los Angeles Herald-Examiner
Mexican American Sun (community weekly)
New Times LA
Northeast Sun (community weekly)
Tuesday's Child
Daily Variety
Wyvernwood Chronicle (community weekly)

Television

The Los Angeles area is the home of several major offices and production facilities in the television industry. The Fox Broadcasting Company is based in the Century City district of Los Angeles inside the 20th Century Studios studio lot, while the Fox Television Center is in West Los Angeles. CBS owns CBS Studio Center in Studio City and previously owned Television City in the Fairfax District, although the network still maintains operations on that lot. ABC and parent company Disney produce programs at the Walt Disney Studios in Burbank and The Prospect Studios in the Los Feliz neighborhood. NBC primarily produced shows at what is now The Burbank Studios before parent NBCUniversal moved their operations to a complex adjacent to the Universal Studios lot. Several other film studios may also produce TV shows on their respective lots.

Broadcast radio
A number of radio stations are broadcast from and/or are licensed to Los Angeles, including the following:

AM stations
 570 KLAC Los Angeles (Sports)
 640 KFI Los Angeles (Talk)1
 670 KIRN Simi Valley (Iranian/ethnic)
 710 KSPN Los Angeles (Sports)
 740 KBRT Costa Mesa (Spanish Christian)
 790 KABC Los Angeles (Conservative talk)
 830 KLAA Orange (Sports)
 870 KRLA Glendale (Conservative talk)
 900 KALI West Covina (Christian)
 930 KHJ Los Angeles (Relevant Radio)
 980 KFWB Los Angeles (Regional Mexican)
 1020 KTNQ Los Angeles (Spanish talk)
 1070 KNX Los Angeles (All-news)1
 1110 KRDC Pasadena (Sports)
 1150 KEIB Los Angeles (Conservative talk)
 1190 KGBN Anaheim (Korean Christian)
 1230 KYPA Los Angeles (Korean)
 1260 KMZT Beverly Hills (Classical)
 1280 KFRN Long Beach (Family Radio)*
 1300 KAZN Pasadena (Mandarin Chinese)
 1330 KWKW Los Angeles (Spanish sports)
 1390 KLTX Long Beach (Spanish religious)
 1430 KMRB San Gabriel (Cantonese)
 1460 KTYM Inglewood (ESNE Radio)
 1540 KMPC Los Angeles (Korean) 
 1580 KBLA Santa Monica (Progressive talk)
 1650 KFOX Torrance (Korean)
 1 clear-channel station

FM stations
Asterisk (*) indicates a non-commercial (public radio/campus/educational) broadcast.
 87.7 KZNO-LD Big Bear Lake (Spanish religious)
 88.1 KKJZ Long Beach (Jazz)*
 88.5 KCSN Northridge (College/AAA)*
 88.9 KXLU Los Angeles (College/freeform)*
 89.3 KPCC Pasadena (NPR/talk)*
 89.9 KCRW Santa Monica (NPR/talk/eclectic)*
 90.3 KMRO Camarillo (Radio Nueva Vida)*
 90.7 KPFK Los Angeles (Pacifica Radio)*
 91.5 KUSC Los Angeles (Classical)*
 92.3 KRRL Los Angeles (Urban contemporary)
 92.7 KYLA Fountain Valley (Air1)*
 93.1 KCBS-FM Los Angeles (Adult hits)
 93.5 KDAY Redondo Beach (Classic hip hop)
 93.9 KLLI Los Angeles (Bilingual Latin trap)
 94.3 KBUA San Fernando (Regional Mexican)
 94.7 KTWV Los Angeles (Urban AC)
 95.5 KLOS Los Angeles (Classic rock)
 95.9 KFSH-FM Glendale (Contemporary Christian)
 96.3 KXOL-FM Los Angeles (Spanish contemporary)
 96.7 KWIZ Santa Ana (Regional Mexican)
 97.1 KNX-FM Los Angeles (All-news)
 97.5 KLYY Riverside (Spanish adult hits)
 97.9 KLAX-FM East Los Angeles (Regional Mexican)
 98.3 KRCV West Covina (Spanish classic hits)
 98.7 KYSR Los Angeles (Alternative rock)
 99.5 KKLA-FM Los Angeles (Christian)
 100.3 KKLQ Los Angeles (K-Love)*
 100.7 KCLA-LP
 101.1 KRTH Los Angeles (Classic hits)
 101.9 KSCA Glendale (Regional Mexican)
 102.3 KJLH Compton (Urban AC)
 102.7 KIIS-FM Los Angeles (Contemporary hit radio)
 103.1 KDLD Santa Monica (Regional Mexican)
 103.5 KOST Los Angeles (Adult contemporary)
 103.9 KRCD Inglewood (Spanish classic hits)
 104.3 KBIG Los Angeles (Hot AC)
 104.7 KOCP Camarillo (Rhythmic oldies)
 105.1 KKGO Los Angeles (Country)
 105.5 KBUE Long Beach (Regional Mexican)
 105.9 KPWR Los Angeles (Rhythmic contemporary)
 106.7 KROQ-FM Pasadena (Alternative rock)
 107.1 KSSE Arcadia (Spanish adult hits)
 107.5 KLVE Los Angeles (Latin pop)

See also

Arts and culture of Los Angeles
History of Los Angeles, California

References

External links 
LA Almanac - Media
Naming Your Business: Newspaper of General Circulation
Ethnic Newspapers – Los Angeles County

Los Angeles
Los Angeles-related lists